Olumide Akpata (born October 7, 1972) is a Nigerian legal practitioner. He is a senior partner and the Head of the Corporate and Commercial Practice Group at Templars law firm in Nigeria. He became the first non-Senior Advocate of Nigeria president of the Nigerian Bar Association in July 2020.

Early life 
Akpata was born on October 7, 1972, at Edo State of Nigeria. He obtained a bachelor's degree in law from University of Benin, Edo state in 1992 and was called to the bar in 1993. He served in the National Youth Service Corps  in Kano State.

Career 
Akpata began his legal practice in Delta state under the tutelage of Dr. Mudiaga Odje, Senior Advocate of Nigeria, OFR, who was one of the most seasoned litigators of his time.

In 1996, Akpata relocated to Lagos and teamed up with his cousin, Oghogho Akpata, who had just set up the law firm Templars the previous year. Akpata joined in the formation of Templars at the age of 23, and has grown the firm into what it is today, as one of the largest law firms in Nigeria with a workforce of about 100 lawyers, including two Senior Advocates of Nigeria, both of whom practice proficiently in diverse areas of Nigerian law.

Akpata is currently senior partner and Head of the Corporate & Commercial Practice Group of Templars. He has participated in some of the major groundbreaking transactions that have shaped commercial law practice in Nigeria and indeed the Nigerian economy. He was chairman of the Nigeria Bar Association Section on Business Law (NBA-SBL).

On July 30, 2020, he was elected as the president of the Nigerian Bar Association after acquiring a total of 9,891 votes of the total 18,256 ballots cast, defeating his closest rival Babatunde Ajibade (SAN) who polled 4,328 votes, and Dele Adesina (SAN) who polled 3,982 votes.

See also 
 List of Nigerian jurists

References 

1972 births
People from Edo State
Living people
Nigerian jurists
University of Benin (Nigeria) alumni